The small square-spot (Diarsia rubi) is a moth of the family Noctuidae. The species was first described by Karl Friedrich Vieweg in 1790. It is found in Europe apart from the far south-east then east through the Caucasus, Transcaucasia, Central Asia, Siberia, the Russian Far East and Kamchatka.

Description

This is a quite a small species (wingspan 30–38 mm) with dull greyish-pink forewings, varying to red brown, marked with a pale angular mark which gives the species its common name. Forewing with the crosslines and shades olive; the cell brown; reniform with whitish outline; claviform with a dark speck at its end; marginal area dark. The hindwings are pale luteous grey with a pink fringe.

Biology
Two broods are produced each year with the adults flying in May and June and again in August and September. Moths of the second brood are usually smaller and darker than those of the first. The species flies at night and is attracted to light and sugar. It will also visit flowers such as heather and ragwort.

The larva feeds on a variety of plants: Recorded food plants include raspberry, Vaccinium and willow. The species overwinters as a larva.

Similar species
Diarsia rubi is difficult to certainly distinguish from its congeners. See Townsend et al.
Protolampra sobrina (Duponchel, 1843) 
Diarsia mendica  ssp. mendica (Fabricius, 1775) 
Diarsia mendica ssp. thulei (Staudinger, 1891) 
Diarsia mendica ssp. orkneyensis (Bytinski-Salz, 1930) 
Diarsia florida (Schmidt, 1859)

References

Chinery, Michael (1986, reprinted 1991). Collins Guide to the Insects of Britain and Western Europe.
Skinner, Bernard (1984). The Colour Identification Guide to Moths of the British Isles.

External links

Lepiforum e.V.

Diarsia
Moths described in 1790
Moths of Asia
Moths of Europe
Taxa named by Karl Friedrich Vieweg